Chetwynd Barracks is a military installation at Chilwell in Nottinghamshire.

History

The Chilwell depot and barracks were built for the Royal Army Ordnance Corps shortly after the First World War on the former site of the National Shell Filling Factory, Chilwell which had been completely devastated by an explosion in July 1918. The site continued to be used as a central ordnance depot after the Second World War and, although the central vehicle kit store closed in 1958, when operations moved to Bicester, it continued to operate as a general stores depot and a vehicle workshop.

The site was renamed Chetwynd Barracks, after Viscount Chetwynd who had been Managing Director of the National Shell Filling Factory, in 1995 and became the home of 49 (East) Brigade.

Under Army 2020, 49 (East) Brigade was merged with 7th Armoured Brigade to become 7th Infantry Brigade and Headquarters East which relocated to Chetwynd Barracks on 13 February 2015.

In late March 2016, the Ministry of Defence announced that the site was one of ten to be sold in order to reduce the size of the Defence Estate. In November 2016 the Ministry of Defence announced that the site would close in 2021. This was subsequently extended to 2024, and once more to 2026.

Operations
Units stationed at Chetwynd Barracks include:
Headquarters, 7th Infantry Brigade
Headquarters East
170 (Infrastructure Support) Engineer Group
62 Works Group Royal Engineers
 63 Works Group Royal Engineers
 64 Works Group Royal Engineers
65 Works Group Royal Engineers (V)
 66 Works Group Royal Engineers
Nottinghamshire Band of the Corps of Royal Engineers
Mission Training and Mobilisation Centre (Individual) (MTMC(I))
Nottingham Troop, 721 Explosive Ordnance Disposal Squadron RLC

See also
 Chilwell Filling Factory Memorial

References

Installations of the British Army
Barracks in England